Automobiles Dangel is a French specialist automobile company based in Sentheim, Alsace. It has produced 4x4 versions of Citroën and Peugeot vehicles since 1980. Its first conversion was the Peugeot 504 and since then Dangel has converted over 22,000 vehicles. Originally a producer of competition cars, beginning in the late sixties, their first four-wheel drive conversions were developed with the direct assistance of Peugeot's own engineers.

Former models
Dangel also produced modified versions of the following vehicles:
 Peugeot 504 pick-up and station wagon
 Peugeot 505 station wagon
 Citroën C15
 Citroën C25

Current models
Dangel currently modifies the following vehicles:

4x2

Both the Peugeot Bipper and Citroën Nemo 1.3 HDi 75 hp are available with Dangel's Trek 2WD version which has a 200mm chassis lift, engine skidplate and a limited-slip differential.

4x4

 Citroën - Berlingo, Jumpy, and Jumper
 Fiat - Ducato and Scudo
 Peugeot - Peugeot Boxer, Expert, and Partner

References

External links
 Company Website

Automotive transmission makers
French brands
Car manufacturers of France